Henry Franklin Clough  "F. C." Nichols (1833–1890) was a member of the Wisconsin State Assembly.

Biography
Nichols was born on February 9, 1833, in Kingston, New Hampshire. He graduated from Pembroke Academy in Pembroke, New Hampshire. In 1859, he graduated from Williams College. After attending Union Theological Seminary, Nichols graduated from Andover Theological Seminary in 1864. He later became a trustee and clerk of a Congregational church.

On May 12, 1868, Nichols married Nettie Williams. They would have six children. Nettie was niece of Isaac Hill, a member of the United States Senate and Governor of New Hampshire.

Political career
Nichols was a member of the Assembly in 1872, 1873, and 1879. Other positions he held include President (similar to Mayor) and member of the Village Board (similar to city council) of New Lisbon, Wisconsin and Chairman of the County Board of Supervisors of Juneau County, Wisconsin. He was a Republican. He died on June 4, 1890, of heart disease in West Superior, Wisconsin.

References

External links

People from Kingston, New Hampshire
People from Pembroke, New Hampshire
People from New Lisbon, Wisconsin
Republican Party members of the Wisconsin State Assembly
Mayors of places in Wisconsin
Wisconsin city council members
County supervisors in Wisconsin
American Congregationalists
19th-century Congregationalists
Union Theological Seminary (New York City) alumni
Williams College alumni
1833 births
1890 deaths
Andover Theological Seminary alumni
19th-century American politicians